Raymond Eid (August 6, 1930  - June 11, 2012) was the Maronite Catholic Archeparchy of Damascus, Syria.

Life

Eid was born in Mazraat el Daher, Lebanon on August 6, 1930. Ordained to the priesthood on 30 May 1957 to the Maronite Catholic Eparchy of Sidon, Eid was elected Archbishop of the Maronite Catholic Archeparchy of Damascus on 5 June 1999 by the Maronite Synod.

Maronite Patriarch of Antioch, Nasrallah Boutros Sfeir, gave him on November 20 of the same year the Episcopal ordination. His co-consecrators were Tanios El Khoury, Eparch of Sidon, and Emile Eid, Vice-President of the Commission for the codification of the Eastern Churches' law.

He retired on 25 September 2005. and in 2006 Pope Benedict XVI accepted his age-related withdrawal.

Notes

External links
 http://www.catholic-hierarchy.org/bishop/beid.html Raymond Eid

Lebanese Maronites
21st-century Maronite Catholic bishops
Syrian Maronites
Syrian people of Lebanese descent
People from Chouf District
1930 births
2012 deaths
20th-century Maronite Catholic bishops